Sadika is a tributary of the river Vrbanja in Bosnia and Herzegovina.

References

See also
 Demićka

Rivers of Bosnia and Herzegovina